In Ireland, there are two categories of social security, contributory (social insurance), and non-contributory (social assistance), as well as three main types of payments:

 Social insurance payments
 Means-tested payments
 Universal payments

All benefits are administered by the Department of Social Protection, which is divided into two parts, the Aireacht which is responsible for "policy formulation, legislations and general administration" and Social Welfare Services which is responsible for the "day-to-day running and delivery of services" of the department.

Social Assistance 
In order to qualify for social assistance, the applicant must undergo a means test and a habitual residence test.

Social assistance programs include:

 Back to Work Family Dividend
 Blind Pension
 Carer's Allowance
 Child Benefit
 Disability Allowance
 Domiciliary Care Allowance
 Guardian's Payment (Non-Contributory)
 Jobseeker's Allowance and Jobseeker's Allowance Transitional payment
 One-Parent Family Payment
 State Pension (Non-Contributory)
 Supplementary Welfare Allowance
 Widow's, Widower's or Surviving Civil Partner's (Non-Contributory) Pension

State Pension (Contributory) 
The state pension (contributory) falls under the social insurance category. To be eligible, you need to have

 been making Pay Related Social Insurance contributions before the age of 56
 have made three years worth of contributions if the pensioner reached pension age before 6 April 2002, have made five years worth of contributions if the pensioner reached pension age between 6 April 2002 and 5 April 2012, have made 10 years of contributions if the pensioner reached pension age after 6 April 2012
 have made enough contributions per year if the pensioner reached pension age on or before 1 September 2012, or have made enough contributions total if the pensioner reached pension age after 1 September 2012

The payments for those who qualified on or before the 1st of September, 2012 are:

The payments for those who qualified after the 1st of September, 2012 are:

The pensioner also receives an additional €10 once they reach 80 years of age, and may be eligible for other benefits.

State Pension (Non-Contributory) 
The State Pension (Non-Contributory) falls under the social assistance category. It provides payments to those over 66 who did not make enough payments for State Pension (Contributory). To be eligible, a pensioner must:

 be 66 years or older
 not be on the State Pension (Contributory)
 pass a means and habitual residence test

Disability
People who have paid sufficient Pay Related Social Insurance into the national Social Insurance Fund may qualify for Illness Benefit for one or two years.  They may then qualify for Invalidity Pension, which can continue until age 66.

Injury Benefit and Disablement Benefit may be payable to people disabled  as a result of an accident at work or a prescribed disease contracted at work.

Disability Allowance is payable to disabled people over 16 and under 66 years of age.  The disability must have continued, or be expected to continue, for at least 12 months. It must cause substantial restrictions in undertaking work that would otherwise be suitable for a person of your age, experience and qualifications.

Supplementary Welfare Allowance
Supplementary Welfare Allowance is paid to people whose income is less than the rate judged sufficient for their family.  This is subject to a means test.

Widows and widowers
May be eligible for Widow's/Widower's (Contributory) Pension (Pinsean Ranníocach Baintrí (Fir agus Mná)), the Bereavement Grant (Deontas Báis), the Widowed Parents Grant (Deontas Báis Bhaintrí/Bhaintrí Fir) and/or the Special Funeral Grant (Deontas Speiseálta Sochraide).

Payments for the Widow's/Widower's Pension are as follows:

For each child dependant, €22.00 (€24.00 from January 2008) is added.

More information on the Widow's/Widower's Pension scheme can be found here.

The Bereavement Grant is a simple one-off payment of €850, given after a death to the deceased's family. More information can be found here and here.

The Widowed Parents Grant is a one-off payment of €6,000, given to widows/widowers with one or more child dependants living with them. However, there are other rules regarding the payment; more information can be found here.

The Special Funeral Grant is another one-off payment of €850, given to the deceased's family. It is only available if the person dies at work. More information can be found here.

References

External links
Citizens Information (Ireland) website, Death related benefits page